Steven Zierk (born August 27, 1993) is an American chess Grandmaster. He is best known for being the 2010 World Under 18 Chess Champion. He finished with 9.5/11, one point ahead of second-place finisher Samvel Ter-Sahakyan. In 2015, Steven graduated from the Massachusetts Institute of Technology, where he was a brother at the Phi Kappa Sigma fraternity. 
In June 2018, Zierk earned his final GM norm by earning first place in the Charlotte Chess Center's Summer 2018 GM Norm Invitational held in Charlotte, North Carolina with an undefeated score of 6.5/9.

References

External links

Steven Zierk chess games - 365Chess.com

1993 births
Living people
American chess players
Chess grandmasters
World Youth Chess Champions